Broken Ridge Buddhist Temple is a Korean Buddhist temple on the island of Oahu in the U.S. state of Hawaii.  Originally known as the "Dae Won Sa Temple," it was constructed on King St in Honolulu in 1975.  After being destroyed by fire, construction of the new temple located in the Palolo Valley began in 1986.  Due to legal disputes construction was not completed until 2005.

Legal disputes
In February 1988, residents of Palolo filed the first of several lawsuits in an effort to legally force the height of the temple to be lowered.  In 2001, the roof was lowered by over two meters to comply with a court order.

External links
http://www.hawaiimuryangsa.com
http://archives.starbulletin.com/2001/08/07/news/story2.html
http://archives.starbulletin.com/2001/04/28/news/story7.html
https://web.archive.org/web/20110719081640/http://eng.buddhapia.com/_Service/_ContentView/ETC_CONTENT_2.ASP?pk=0001420570&sub_pk=&clss_cd=0002179855&top_menu_cd=0000000302

Korean-American culture in Hawaii
Buddhist temples in Hawaii
Hawaiian architecture
1975 establishments in Hawaii